Daniar Kenzhekhanov (Kazakh: Дәнияр Кенжеханов; born 20 January 1983) is a Kazakhstani professional footballer. He plays as a forward for the Kazakhstan national football team and FC Bayterek since July 2012.

As of July 2007 he has 6 caps and scored a goal for the national team, including scoring a goal in a 2006 FIFA World Cup qualifier against Georgia on 17 August 2005.

References

External links

Living people
1983 births
Kazakhstani footballers
Association football forwards
Kazakhstan international footballers